Little River Airport  is a small county-owned public-use airport located three nautical miles (6 km) southeast of the central business district of Little River, in Mendocino County, California, United States.

Although most U.S. airports use the same three-letter location identifier for the FAA and IATA, this airport is assigned LLR by the FAA but has no designation from the IATA.

History 
In 1945, this airport was built by the Navy served as an outlying field to NALF Santa Rosa.  The Naval Auxiliary Air Station at Santa Rosa, California, was part of a network of training airfields supporting Naval Air Station Alameda.

The airport offered commercial air service beginning in the late 1940s, provided by Southwest Airways utilizing World War II surplus DC-3s.

Facilities and aircraft 
For the 12-month period ending February 4, 2004, the airport had 6,300 aircraft operations, an average of 17 per day: 98% general aviation and 2% air taxi.

References

External links 
 Mendocino County - Dept. of Transportation - Airports
 Little River Airport Pilot's Association
 
 

Airports in Mendocino County, California